Crete (Modern:  ,) is the largest and most populous of the Greek islands, the 88th largest island in the world and the fifth largest island in the Mediterranean Sea, after Sicily, Sardinia, Cyprus, and Corsica. It bounds the southern border of the Aegean Sea, with the Sea of Crete (or North Cretan Sea) to the north and the Libyan Sea (or South Cretan Sea) to the south.

Crete and a number of islands and islets that surround it constitute the Region of Crete, which is the southernmost of the 13 top-level administrative units of Greece, and the fifth most populous of Greece's regions. Its capital and largest city is Heraklion, on the north shore of the island. , the region had a population of 636,504. The Dodecanese are located to the northeast of Crete, while the Cyclades are situated to the north, separated by the Sea of Crete. The Peloponnese is to the region's northwest.

Humans have inhabited the island since at least 130,000 years ago, during the Paleolithic age. Crete was the centre of Europe's first advanced civilization, the Minoans, from 2700 to 1420 BC. The Minoan civilization was overrun by the Mycenaean civilization from mainland Greece. Crete was later ruled by Rome, then successively by the Byzantine Empire, Andalusian Arabs, the Venetian Republic, and the Ottoman Empire. In 1898 Crete, whose people had for some time wanted to join the Greek state, achieved independence from the Ottomans, formally becoming the Cretan State. Crete became part of Greece in December 1913.

The island is mostly mountainous, and its character is defined by a high mountain range crossing from west to east. It includes Crete's highest point, Mount Ida, and the range of the White Mountains (Lefka Ori) with 30 summits above  in altitude and the Samaria Gorge, a World Biosphere Reserve. Crete forms a significant part of the economy and cultural heritage of Greece, while retaining its own local cultural traits (such as its own poetry and music). The Nikos Kazantzakis airport at Heraklion and the Daskalogiannis airport at Chania serve international travelers. The palace of Knossos, a Bronze Age settlement and ancient Minoan city, is also located in Heraklion.

Name

The earliest references to the island of Crete come from texts from the Syrian city of Mari dating from the 18th century BC, where the island is referred to as Kaptara. This is repeated later in Neo-Assyrian records and the Bible (Caphtor).

In Ancient Greek, the name Crete first appears in Homer's Odyssey. Its etymology is unknown. One proposal derives it from a hypothetical Luwian word  (compare  'island',  'cutting, sliver'). Another proposal suggests that it derives from the ancient Greek word "κραταιή" (krataie̅), meaning strong or powerful, the reasoning being that Crete was the strongest thalassocracy during ancient times.

In Latin, the name of the island became . Under Ottoman rule, in Ottoman Turkish, Crete was called . In the Hebrew Bible, Crete is referred to as  "kretim".

Physical geography

Crete is the largest island in Greece and the fifth largest island in the Mediterranean Sea. It is located in the southern part of the Aegean Sea separating the Aegean from the Libyan Sea.

Island morphology

Mountains and valleys

Crete is mountainous, and its character is defined by a high mountain range crossing from west to east, formed by six different groups of mountains:
The White Mountains or Lefka Ori 
The Idi Range (Psiloritis)  
Asterousia Mountains 
Kedros 
The Dikti Mountains 
Thripti 

These mountains lavish Crete with valleys, such as Amari valley, fertile plateaus, such as Lasithi plateau, Omalos and Nidha; caves, such as Gourgouthakas, Diktaion, and Idaion (the birthplace of the ancient Greek god Zeus); and a number of gorges.

The mountains have been seen as a key feature of the island's distinctiveness, especially since the time of Romantic travellers' writing. Contemporary Cretans distinguish between highlanders and lowlanders; the former often claim to reside in places affording a higher/better climatic and moral environment. In keeping with the legacy of Romantic authors, the mountains are seen as having determined their residents' 'resistance' to past invaders which relates to the oft-encountered idea that highlanders are 'purer' in terms of less intermarriages with occupiers. For residents of mountainous areas, such as Sfakia in western Crete, the aridness and rockiness of the mountains is emphasised as an element of pride and is often compared to the alleged soft-soiled mountains of others parts of Greece or the world.

Gorges, rivers and lakes
The island has a number of gorges, such as the Samariá Gorge, Imbros Gorge, Kourtaliotiko Gorge, Ha Gorge, Platania Gorge, the Gorge of the Dead (at Kato Zakros, Sitia) and Richtis Gorge and (Richtis) waterfall at Exo Mouliana in Sitia.

The rivers of Crete include the Ieropotamos River, the Koiliaris, the Anapodiaris, the Almiros, the Giofyros, and Megas Potamos. There are only two freshwater lakes in Crete: Lake Kournas and Lake Agia, which are both in Chania regional unit. Lake Voulismeni at the coast, at Aghios Nikolaos, was formerly a freshwater lake but is now connected to the sea, in Lasithi. Three artificial lakes created by dams also exist in Crete: the lake of Aposelemis Dam, the lake of Potamos Dam, and the lake of Mpramiana Dam.

Surrounding islands

A large number of islands, islets, and rocks hug the coast of Crete. Many are visited by tourists, some are only visited by archaeologists and biologists. Some are environmentally protected. A small sample of the islands includes:
Gramvousa (Kissamos, Chania) the pirate island opposite the Balo lagoon
Elafonisi (Chania), which commemorates a shipwreck and an Ottoman massacre
Chrysi island (Ierapetra, Lasithi), which hosts the largest natural Juniperus macrocarpa forest in Europe
Paximadia island (Agia Galini, Rethymno) where the god Apollo and the goddess Artemis were born
The Venetian fort and leper colony at Spinalonga opposite the beach and shallow waters of Elounda (Agios Nikolaos, Lasithi)
Dionysades islands which are in an environmentally protected region together with the Palm Beach Forest of Vai in the municipality of Sitia, Lasithi

Climate

Crete straddles two climatic zones, the Mediterranean and the North African, mainly falling within the former. As such, the climate in Crete is primarily Mediterranean. The atmosphere can be quite humid, depending on the proximity to the sea, while winter is fairly mild. Snowfall is common on the mountains between November and May, but rare in the low-lying areas. While some mountain tops are snow-capped for most of the year, near the coast snow stays on the ground for a few minutes or hours. However, an exceptional cold snap swept the island in February 2004, during which the entire island was blanketed with snow. During the Cretan summer, average temperatures reach the high 20s to low 30s Celsius (mid 80s to mid 90s Fahrenheit), with maxima touching the upper 30s to mid 40s.

The south coast, including the Mesara Plain and Asterousia Mountains, falls in the North African climatic zone, enjoying significantly more sunny days and high temperatures throughout the year. There, date palms bear fruit, and swallows remain year-round rather than migrate to Africa. The fertile region around Ierapetra, on the southeastern corner of the island, has year-round agricultural production, with summer vegetables and fruit produced in greenhouses throughout the winter. Western Crete (Chania province) receives more rain and the soils there suffer more erosion compared to the Eastern part of Crete.

According to the Hellenic National Meteorological Service, South Crete receives the most sunshine in Greece with more than 3,257 hours of sunshine per year.

Human geography
Crete is the most populous island in Greece with a population of more than 600,000 people. Approximately 42% live in Crete's main cities and towns whilst 45% live in rural areas.

Administration

Crete with its nearby islands form the Crete Region, one of the 13 regions of Greece which were established in the 1987 administrative reform. Under the 2010 Kallikratis plan, the powers and authority of the regions were redefined and extended. The region is based at Heraklion and is divided into four regional units (pre-Kallikratis prefectures). From west to east these are: Chania, Rethymno, Heraklion, and Lasithi. These are further subdivided into 24 municipalities.

The region's governor is, since 1 January 2011, Stavros Arnaoutakis, who was elected in the November 2010 local administration elections for the Panhellenic Socialist Movement.

Cities

Heraklion is the largest city and capital of Crete, holding more than a fourth of the island's population. Chania was the capital until 1971. The principal cities are:

 Heraklion (Iraklion or Candia) (144,422 inhabitants)
 Chania (Haniá) (53,910 inhabitants)
 Rethymno (34,300 inhabitants)
 Ierapetra (23,707 inhabitants)
 Agios Nikolaos (20,679 inhabitants)
 Sitia (14,338 inhabitants)

Demographics
The region has shrunk by 5,705 people between 2011 and 2021, experiencing a population loss of 0.9%.

Economy

The economy of Crete is predominantly based on services and tourism. However, agriculture also plays an important role and Crete is one of the few Greek islands that can support itself without a tourism industry. The economy began to change visibly during the 1970s as tourism gained in importance. Although an emphasis remains on agriculture and stock breeding, because of the climate and terrain of the island, there has been a drop in manufacturing, and an observable expansion in its service industries (mainly tourism-related). All three sectors of the Cretan economy (agriculture/farming, processing-packaging, services), are directly connected and interdependent. The island has a per capita income much higher than the Greek average, whereas unemployment is at approximately 4%, one-sixth of that of the country overall.

As in many regions of Greece, viticulture and olive groves are significant; oranges, citrons and avocadoes are also cultivated. Until recently there were restrictions on the import of bananas to Greece, therefore bananas were grown on the island, predominantly in greenhouses. Dairy products are important to the local economy and there are a number of specialty cheeses such as mizithra, anthotyros, and kefalotyri.

20% of Greek wine is produced in Crete, mostly in the region of Peza 

The Gross domestic product (GDP) of the region was €9.4 billion in 2018, accounting for 5.1% of Greek economic output. GDP per capita adjusted for purchasing power was €17,800 or 59% of the EU27 average in the same year. The GDP per employee was 68% of the EU average. Crete is the region in Greece with the fifth highest GDP per capita.

Transport infrastructure

Airports
The island has three significant airports, Nikos Kazantzakis at Heraklion, the Daskalogiannis airport at Chania and a smaller one in Sitia. The first two serve international routes, acting as the main gateways to the island for travellers. There is a long-standing plan to replace Heraklion airport with a new airport at Kastelli, where there is presently an air force base.

Ferries
The island is well served by ferries, mostly from Piraeus, by ferry companies such as Minoan Lines and ANEK Lines. Seajets operates routes to Cyclades.

Road network
Although almost everywhere is served by the road network, there is a lack of modern highways, although this is gradually changing with the completion of the northern coastal spine highway. In addition, a European Union study has been devised to promote a modern highway to connect the northern and southern parts of the island via a tunnel. The study proposal includes a  section of road between the villages of Agia Varvara and Agia Deka in central Crete. It is hoped to benefit both tourists and locals by improving the connections to the southern part of the island and by reducing accidents. The new road section forms part of the route between Messara in the south and Crete's largest city Heraklion, which houses the island's airport and principal ferry links with mainland Greece. Traffic speeds on the new road will increase by 19 km/hour (from 29 km/hour to 48 km/hour), which should reduce journey times between Messara and Heraklion by 55 minutes. The scheme is also expected to improve road safety by cutting the number of accidents along the route. Building works include construction of three road tunnels, five bridges and three junctions. This project is expected to create 44 jobs during the implementation phase.

The investment falls under Greece's "Improvement of Accessibility" Operational Programme, which aims to improve the country's transport infrastructure as well as its international connections. The Operational Programme works to link Greece's more prosperous and less developed regions, and thus help to promote greater territorial cohesion.

Total investment for the project "Completion of construction of the section of Ag. Varvara – Ag. Deka (Kasteli) (22+170 km to 37+900 km) of the vertical road axis Irakleio – Messara in the prefecture of Irakleio, Kriti" is EUR 102 273 321, of which the EU's European Regional Development Fund is contributing EUR 86,932,323 from the Operational Programme "Improvement of Accessibility" for the 2007 to 2013 programming period. Work falls under the priority "Road Transport – trans-European and trans-regional route network of the regions on the Convergence objective".

Railway
Also, during the 1930s there was a narrow-gauge industrial railway in Heraklion, from Giofyros in the west side of the city to the port. There are now no railway lines on Crete. The government is planning the construction of a line from Chania to Heraklion via Rethymno.

Development
The construction sector in Crete responded well during the pandemic and has come out strong in the post-recession recovery period. Total construction spending recovered and is expected to peak a record high (approximately 8% higher than 2019 average levels) signalling consistent expansion in construction projects and real estate investments in Crete. The evolution of the private sector in Crete is tightly linked with the demand for tourism-related investments. Moreover, the recovery of the tourism sector is expected to lead to further growth in housing prices and rental demand.

Newspapers have reported that the Ministry of Mercantile Marine is ready to support the agreement between Greece, South Korea, Dubai Ports World and China for the construction of a large international container port and free trade zone in southern Crete near Tympaki; the plan is to expropriate  of land. The port would handle two million containers per year, but the project has not been universally welcomed because of its environmental, economic and cultural impact. As of January 2013, the project has still not been confirmed, although there is mounting pressure to approve it, arising from Greece's difficult economic situation.

There are plans for underwater cables going from mainland Greece to Israel and Egypt passing by Crete and Cyprus: EuroAfrica Interconnector and EuroAsia Interconnector. They would connect Crete electrically with mainland Greece, ending energy isolation of Crete. At present Greece covers electricity cost differences for Crete of around €300 million per year.

History

Hominids settled in Crete at least 130,000 years ago. In the later Neolithic and Bronze Age periods, under the Minoans, Crete had a highly developed, literate civilization. It has been ruled by various ancient Greek entities, the Roman Empire, the Byzantine Empire, the Emirate of Crete, the Republic of Venice and the Ottoman Empire. After a brief period of independence (1897–1913) under a provisional Cretan government, it joined the Kingdom of Greece. It was occupied by Nazi Germany during the Second World War.

Prehistory

In 2002, the paleontologist Gerard Gierlinski discovered fossil footprints possibly left by ancient human relatives 5,600,000 years ago.

The first human settlement in Crete dates to more than 130,000 years ago, during the Paleolithic age. Settlements dating to the aceramic Neolithic in the 7th millennium BC, used cattle, sheep, goats, pigs and dogs as well as domesticated cereals and legumes; ancient Knossos was the site of one of these major Neolithic (then later Minoan) sites. Other neolithic settlements include those at Kephala, Magasa, and Trapeza.

Minoan civilization

During the Bronze Age, Crete was the centre of the Minoan, notable for its art, its writing systems such as Linear A, and for its massive building complexes including the palace at Knossos. Its economy benefited from a network of trade around much of the Mediterranean, and Minoan cultural influence extended to Cyprus, Canaan, and the Egypt. Some scholars have speculated that legends such as that of the minotaur have a historical basis in Minoan times.

Mycenaean civilization

In 1420 BC, the Minoan civilization was subsumed by the Mycenaean civilization from mainland Greece. The oldest samples of writing in the Greek language, as identified by Michael Ventris, is the Linear B archive from Knossos, dated approximately to 1425–1375 BC.

Archaic and Classical period 

After the Bronze Age collapse, Crete was settled by new waves of Greeks from the mainland. A number of city states developed in the Archaic period. There was limited contact with mainland Greece, and Greek historiography shows little interest in Crete, as a result, there are few literary sources.

During the 6th to 4th centuries BC, Crete was comparatively free from warfare. The Gortyn code (5th century BC) is evidence for how codified civil law established a balance between aristocratic power and civil rights.

In the late 4th century BC, the aristocratic order began to collapse due to endemic infighting among the elite, and Crete's economy was weakened by prolonged wars between city states. During the 3rd century BC, Gortyn, Kydonia (Chania), Lyttos and Polyrrhenia challenged the primacy of ancient Knossos.

While the cities continued to prey upon one another, they invited into their feuds mainland powers like Macedon and its rivals Rhodes and Ptolemaic Egypt. In 220 BC the island was tormented by a war between two opposing coalitions of cities. As a result, the Macedonian king Philip V gained hegemony over Crete which lasted to the end of the Cretan War (205–200 BC), when the Rhodians opposed the rise of Macedon and the Romans started to interfere in Cretan affairs.

In the 2nd century BC Ierapytna (Ierapetra) gained supremacy on eastern Crete.

Roman rule

Crete was involved in the Mithridatic Wars, initially repelling an attack by Roman general Marcus Antonius Creticus in 71 BC. Nevertheless, a ferocious three-year campaign soon followed under Quintus Caecilius Metellus, equipped with three legions. Crete was conquered by Rome in 69 BC, earning for Metellus the title "Creticus". Gortyn was made capital of the island, and Crete became a Roman province, along with Cyrenaica that was called Creta et Cyrenaica. Archaeological remains suggest that Crete under Roman rule witnessed prosperity and increased connectivity with other parts of the Empire. In the 2nd century AD, at least three cities in Crete (Lyttos, Gortyn, Hierapytna) joined the Panhellenion, a league of Greek cities founded by the emperor Hadrian. When Diocletian redivided the Empire, Crete was placed, along with Cyrene, under the diocese of Moesia, and later by Constantine I to the diocese of Macedonia.

Byzantine Empire – first period

Crete was separated from Cyrenaica . It remained a province within the eastern half of the Roman Empire, usually referred to as the Eastern Roman (Byzantine) Empire after the establishment of a second capital in Constantinople by Constantine in 330. Crete was subjected to an attack by Vandals in 467, the great earthquakes of 365 and 415, a raid by Slavs in 623, Arab raids in 654 and the 670s, and again in the 8th century. In , the Emperor Leo III the Isaurian transferred the island from the jurisdiction of the Pope to that of the Patriarchate of Constantinople.

Andalusian Arab rule

In the 820s, after 900 years as a Roman island, Crete was captured by Andalusian Muwallads led by Abu Hafs, who established the Emirate of Crete. The Byzantines launched a campaign that took most of the island back in 842 and 843 under Theoktistos. Further Byzantine campaigns in 911 and 949 failed. In 960–61, Nikephoros Phokas' campaign restored Crete to the Byzantine Empire, after a century and a half of Arab control.

Byzantine Empire – second period

In 961, Nikephoros Phokas returned the island to Byzantine rule after expelling the Arabs. Extensive efforts at conversion of the populace were undertaken, led by John Xenos and Nikon "the Metanoeite". The reconquest of Crete was a major achievement for the Byzantines, as it restored Byzantine control over the Aegean littoral and diminished the threat of Saracen pirates, for which Crete had provided a base of operations.

In 1204, the Fourth Crusade seized and sacked the imperial capital of Constantinople. Crete was initially granted to leading Crusader Boniface of Montferrat in the partition of spoils that followed. However, Boniface sold his claim to the Republic of Venice, whose forces made up the majority of the Crusade. Venice's rival the Republic of Genoa immediately seized the island and it was not until 1212 that Venice secured Crete as a colony.

Venetian rule

From 1212, during Venice's rule, which lasted more than four centuries, a Renaissance swept through the island as is evident from the artistic works dating to that period. Known as The Cretan School or Post-Byzantine Art, it is among the last flowerings of the artistic traditions of the fallen empire. This included the painter El Greco and the writers Nicholas Kalliakis (1645–1707), Georgios Kalafatis (professor) (–1720), Andreas Musalus (–1721) and Vitsentzos Kornaros.

Under the rule of the Catholic Venetians, the city of Candia was reputed to be the best fortified city of the Eastern Mediterranean. The three main forts were located at Gramvousa, Spinalonga, and Fortezza at Rethymnon. Other fortifications include the Kazarma fortress at Sitia.

In 1492, Jews expelled from Spain settled on the island. In 1574–77, Crete was under the rule of Giacomo Foscarini as Proveditor General, Sindace and Inquisitor. According to Starr's 1942 article, the rule of Giacomo Foscarini was a Dark Age for Jews and Greeks. Under his rule, non-Catholics had to pay high taxes with no allowances. In 1627, there were 800 Jews in the city of Candia, about seven percent of the city's population. Marco Foscarini was the Doge of Venice during this time.

Ottoman rule

The Ottomans conquered Crete (Girit Eyâleti) in 1669, after the siege of Candia. Many Greek Cretans fled to other regions of the Republic of Venice after the Ottoman–Venetian Wars, some even prospering such as the family of Simone Stratigo (c. 1733 – c. 1824) who migrated to Dalmatia from Crete in 1669.

Islamic presence on the island, aside from the interlude of the Arab occupation, was cemented by the Ottoman conquest. Most Cretan Muslims were local Greek converts who spoke Cretan Greek, but in the island's 19th-century political context they came to be viewed by the Christian population as Turks. Contemporary estimates vary, but on the eve of the Greek War of Independence (1830), as much as 45% of the population of the island may have been Muslim. A number of Sufi orders were widespread throughout the island, the Bektashi order being the most prevalent, possessing at least five tekkes. Many Cretan Turks fled Crete because of the unrest, settling in Turkey, Rhodes, Syria, Libya and elsewhere. By 1900, 11% of the population was Muslim. Those remaining were relocated in the 1924 population exchange between Greece and Turkey.

During Easter of 1770, a revolt against Ottoman rule in Crete was started by Daskalogiannis, a shipowner from Sfakia who was promised support by Orlov's fleet which never arrived. Daskalogiannis eventually surrendered to the Ottoman authorities. Today, the airport at Chania is named after him.

During the Greek war of independence, Sultan Mahmud II granted rule over Crete to Egypt's ruler Muhammad Ali Pasha in exchange for his military support. Crete was subsequently left out of the new Greek state established under the London Protocol of 1830. Its administration by Muhammad Ali was confirmed in the Convention of Kütahya of 1833, but direct Ottoman rule was re-established by the Convention of London of 3 July 1840.

Heraklion was surrounded by high walls and bastions and extended westward and southward by the 17th century. The most opulent area of the city was the northeastern quadrant where the elite were gathered. The city had received another name under the rule of the Ottomans, "the deserted city". The urban policy that the Ottoman applied to Candia was a two-pronged approach. The first was the religious endowments. It made the Ottoman elite contribute to building and rehabilitating the ruined city. The other method was to boost the population and the urban revenue by selling off urban properties. According to Molly Greene (2001) there were numerous records of real-estate transactions during the Ottoman rule. In the deserted city, minorities received equal rights in purchasing property. Christians and Jews were also able to buy and sell in the real-estate market.

The Cretan Revolt of 1866–1869 or Great Cretan Revolution was a three-year uprising against Ottoman rule, the third and largest in a series of revolts between the end of the Greek War of Independence in 1830 and the establishment of the independent Cretan State in 1898. A particular event which caused strong reactions among the liberal circles of western Europe was the Holocaust of Arkadi. The event occurred in November 1866, as a large Ottoman force besieged the Arkadi Monastery, which served as the headquarters of the rebellion. In addition to its 259 defenders, over 700 women and children had taken refuge in the monastery. After a few days of hard fighting, the Ottomans broke into the monastery. At that point, the abbot of the monastery set fire to the gunpowder stored in the monastery's vaults, causing the death of most of the rebels and the women and children sheltered there.

Cretan State 1898–1908

Following the repeated uprisings in 1841, 1858, 1889, 1895 and 1897 by the Cretan people, who wanted to join Greece, the Great Powers decided to restore order and in February 1897 sent in troops. The island was subsequently garrisoned by troops from Great Britain, France, Italy and Russia; Germany and Austro-Hungary withdrawing from the occupation in early 1898. During this period Crete was governed through a committee of admirals from the remaining four Powers. In March 1898 the Powers decreed, with the reluctant consent of the Sultan, that the island would be granted autonomy under Ottoman suzerainty in the near future.

In September 1898 the Candia massacre in Candia, modern Heraklion, left over 500 Cretan Christians and 14 British servicemen dead at the hands of Muslim irregulars. As a result, the Admirals ordered the expulsion of all Ottoman troops and administrators from the island, a move that was ultimately completed by early November. The decision to grant autonomy to the island was enforced and a High Commissioner, Prince George of Greece, appointed, arriving to take up his post in December 1898. The flag of the Cretan State was chosen by the Powers, with the white star representing the Ottoman suzerainty over the island.

In 1905, disagreements between Prince George and minister Eleftherios Venizelos over the question of the enosis (union with Greece), such as the Prince's autocratic style of government, resulted in the Theriso revolt, one of the leaders being Eleftherios Venizelos.

Prince George resigned as High Commissioner and was replaced by Alexandros Zaimis, a former Greek prime minister, in 1906. In 1908, taking advantage of domestic turmoil in Turkey as well as the timing of Zaimis's vacation away from the island, the Cretan deputies unilaterally declared union with Greece.

With the outbreak of the First Balkan War, the Greek government declared that Crete was now Greek territory. This was not recognised internationally until 1 December 1913.

Second World War

During World War II, the island was the scene of the Battle of Crete in May 1941. The initial 11-day battle was bloody and left more than 11,000 soldiers and civilians killed or wounded. As a result of the fierce resistance from both Allied forces and civilian Cretan locals, the invasion force suffered heavy casualties, and Adolf Hitler forbade further large-scale paratroop operations for the rest of the war.

During the initial and subsequent occupation, German firing squads routinely executed male civilians in reprisal for the death of German soldiers; civilians were rounded up randomly in local villages for the mass killings, such as at the Massacre of Kondomari and the Viannos massacres. Two German generals were later tried and executed for their roles in the killing of 3,000 of the island's inhabitants.

Civil War
In the aftermath of the Dekemvriana in Athens, Cretan leftists were targeted by the right-wing paramilitary organization National Organization of Rethymno (EOR), which engaged in attacks in the villages of Koxare and Melampes, as well as Rethymno in January 1945. Those attacks did not escalate into a full-scale insurgency as they did in the Greek mainland and the Cretan ELAS did not surrender its weapons after the Treaty of Varkiza. An uneasy truce was maintained until 1947, with a series of arrests of notable communists in Chania and Heraklion. Encouraged by orders from the central organization in Athens, KKE launched an insurgency in Crete; marking the beginning of the Greek Civil War on the island. In eastern Crete the Democratic Army of Greece (DSE) struggled to establish its presence in Dikti and Psilorites. On 1 July 1947, the surviving 55 fighters of DSE were ambushed south of Psilorites, the few surviving members of the unit managed to join the rest of DSE in Lefka Ori.

The Lefka Ori region in the west offered more favourable conditions for DSE's insurgency. In the summer of 1947 DSE raided and looted the Maleme Airport and motor depot at Chrysopigi. Its numbers swelled to approximately 300 fighters. The rise of DSE numbers compounded with crop failure on the island created serious logistical issues for the insurgents. The communists resorted to cattle rustling and crop confiscations which solved the problem only temporarily. In the autumn of 1947, the Greek government offered generous amnesty terms to Cretan DSE fighters and mountain bandits, many of whom opted to abandon armed struggle or defect to the nationalists. On 4 July 1948, government troops launched a large scale offensive on Samariá Gorge. Many DSE soldiers were killed in the fighting while the survivors broke into small armed bands. In October 1948, the secretary of the Cretan KKE Giorgos Tsitilos was killed in an ambush. By the following month only 34 DSE fighters remained active in Lefka Ori. The insurgency in Crete gradually withered away, with the last two hold outs surrendering in 1974, 25 years after the conclusion of the war in mainland Greece.

Tourism

Crete is one of the most popular holiday destinations in Greece. 15% of all arrivals in Greece come through the city of Heraklion (port and airport), while charter journeys to Heraklion make up about 20% of all charter flights in Greece. The number of hotel beds on the island increased by 53% in the period between 1986 and 1991.

Today, the island's tourism infrastructure includes a wide range of accommodation; including large luxury hotels with their complete facilities, swimming pools, sports and recreation, smaller family-owned apartments, camping facilities and others. Visitors reach the island via two international airports in Heraklion and Chania and a smaller airport in Sitia (international charter and domestic flights started in May 2012) or by boat to the main ports of Heraklion, Chania, Rethimno, Agios Nikolaos and Sitia.

Popular tourist attractions include the archaeological sites of the Minoan civilisation, the Venetian old city and port of Chania, the Venetian castle at Rethymno, the gorge of Samaria, the islands of Chrysi, Elafonisi, Gramvousa, Spinalonga and the Palm Beach of Vai, which is the largest natural palm forest in Europe.

Transportation
Crete has an extensive bus system with regular services across the north of the island and from north to south. There are two regional bus stations in Heraklion. Bus routes and timetables can be found on KTEL website.

Holiday homes and immigration 
Crete's mild climate attracts interest from northern Europeans who want a holiday home or residence on the island. EU citizens have the right to freely buy property and reside with little formality. In the cities of Heraklion and Chania, the average price per square metre of apartments ranges from €1,670 to €1,700. A growing number of real estate companies cater mainly to British immigrants, followed by Dutch, German, Scandinavian and other European nationalities wishing to own a home in Crete. The British immigrants are concentrated in the western regional units of Chania and Rethymno and to a lesser extent in Heraklion and Lasithi.

Archaeological sites and museums

The area has a large number of archaeological sites, including the Minoan sites of Knossos, Malia (not to be confused with the town of the same name), Petras and Phaistos, the classical site of Gortys, and the diverse archaeology of the island of Koufonisi, which includes Minoan, Roman, and World War II era ruins (nb. due to conservation concerns, access to Koufonisi has been restricted for the last few years).

There are a museums throughout Crete. The Heraklion Archaeological Museum displays most of the archaeological finds from the Minoan era and was reopened in 2014.

Harmful effects 
Helen Briassoulis, in a qualitative analysis, proposed in the Journal of Sustainable Tourism that Crete is affected by tourism applying pressure to it to develop at an unhealthy rate, and that informal, internal systems within the country are forced to adapt. According to her, these forces have strengthened in three stages: from the period from 1960 to 1970, 1970–1990, and 1990 to the present. During this first period, tourism was a largely positive force, pushing modern developments like running water and electricity onto the largely rural countryside. However, beginning in the second period and especially in the third period leading up to the present day, tourist companies became more pushy with deforestation and pollution of Crete's natural resources. The country is then pulled into an interesting parity, where these companies only upkeep those natural resources that are directly essential to their industry.

Fauna and flora

Fauna

Crete is isolated from mainland Europe, Asia, and Africa, and this is reflected in the diversity of the fauna and flora. As a result, the fauna and flora of Crete have many clues to the evolution of species. There are no animals that are dangerous to humans on the island of Crete in contrast to other parts of Greece. Indeed, the ancient Greeks attributed the lack of large mammals such as bears, wolves, jackals, and venomous snakes, to the labour of Hercules (who took a live Cretan bull to the Peloponnese). Hercules wanted to honor the birthplace of Zeus by removing all "harmful" and "venomous" animals from Crete. Later, Cretans believed that the island was cleared of dangerous creatures by the Apostle Paul, who lived on the island of Crete for two years, with his exorcisms and blessings. 

The Natural History Museum of Crete, operates under the direction of the University of Crete and two aquariums – Aquaworld in Hersonissos and Cretaquarium in Gournes, display sea creatures common in Cretan waters.

Prehistoric fauna
Dwarf elephants, dwarf hippopotamus, dwarf mammoths, dwarf deer, and giant flightless owls were native to Pleistocene Crete. Their ancestors could have reached the island in the time of the Messinian salinity crisis.

Mammals

Mammals of Crete include the vulnerable kri-kri, Capra aegagrus cretica that can be seen in the national park of the Samaria Gorge and on Thodorou, Dia and Agioi Pantes (islets off the north coast), the Cretan wildcat and the Cretan spiny mouse. Other terrestrial mammals include subspecies of the Cretan marten, the Cretan weasel, the Cretan badger, the Cretan wildcat, the long-eared hedgehog, and the edible dormouse.

The Cretan shrew, a type of white-toothed shrew is considered endemic to the island of Crete because this species of shrew is unknown elsewhere. It is a relic species of the Crocidura shrews of which fossils have been found that can be dated to the Pleistocene era. Today it can only be found in the highlands of Crete. It is considered to be the only surviving remnant of the endemic species of the Pleistocene Mediterranean islands.

Bat species include: Blasius's horseshoe bat, the lesser horseshoe bat, the greater horseshoe bat, the lesser mouse-eared bat, Geoffroy's bat, the whiskered bat, Kuhl's pipistrelle, the common pipistrelle, Savi's pipistrelle, the serotine bat, the long-eared bat, Schreibers' bat and the European free-tailed bat.

Birds
Varieties of birds include eagles (can be seen in Lasithi), swallows (throughout Crete in the summer and year-round in the south of the island), pelicans (along the coast), and common cranes (including Gavdos and Gavdopoula). The Cretan mountains and gorges are refuges for the endangered lammergeier vulture. Bird species include: the golden eagle, Bonelli's eagle, the bearded vulture or lammergeier, the griffon vulture, Eleonora's falcon, peregrine falcon, lanner falcon, European kestrel, tawny owl, little owl, hooded crow, alpine chough, red-billed chough, and the Eurasian hoopoe. The population of griffon vultures in Crete is the largest insular one of the species in the world and consists of the majority of the griffon vulture population in Greece.

Reptiles and amphibians
Tortoises can be seen throughout the island. Snakes can be found hiding under rocks. Toads and frogs reveal themselves when it rains.

Reptiles include the Aegean wall lizard, Balkan green lizard, common chameleon, ocellated skink, snake-eyed skink, moorish gecko, Turkish gecko, Kotschy's gecko, spur-thighed tortoise, and the Caspian turtle.

There are four species of snake on the island and these are not dangerous to humans. The four species include the leopard snake (locally known as Ochendra), the Balkan whip snake (locally called Dendrogallia), the dice snake (called Nerofido in Greek), and the only venomous snake is the nocturnal cat snake which has evolved to deliver a weak venom at the back of its mouth to paralyse geckos and small lizards, and is not dangerous to humans.

Sea turtles include the green turtle and the loggerhead turtle which are both threatened species. The loggerhead turtle nests and hatches on north-coast beaches around Rethymno and Chania, and south-coast beaches along the gulf of Mesara.

Amphibians include the European green toad, American bullfrog (introduced), European tree frog, and the Cretan marsh frog (endemic).

Arthropods
Cicadas, known locally as Tzitzikia, make a distinctive repetitive tzi tzi sound that becomes louder and more frequent on hot summer days. Butterfly species include the swallowtail butterfly. Moth species include the hummingbird moth. There are several species of scorpion such as Euscorpius carpathicus whose venom is generally no more potent than a mosquito bite.

Crustaceans and molluscs
River crabs include the semi-terrestrial Potamon potamios crab. Edible snails are widespread and can cluster in the hundreds waiting for rainfall to reinvigorate them.

Sealife

Apart from terrestrial mammals, the seas around Crete are rich in large marine mammals, a fact unknown to most Greeks at present, although reported since ancient times. The Minoan frescoes depicting dolphins in Queen's Megaron at Knossos indicate that Minoans were well aware of and celebrated these creatures. Apart from the endangered Mediterranean monk seal, which lives in almost all the coasts of the country, Greece hosts whales, sperm whales, dolphins and porpoises. The area south of Crete, known as the Greek Abyss, hosts many of them. Squid, octopus, sea turtles and hammerhead sharks can be found along the coast.

Some of the fish that can be seen in the waters around Crete include: scorpion fish, dusky grouper, east Atlantic peacock wrasse, five-spotted wrasse, weever fish, common stingray, brown ray, mediterranean black goby, pearly razorfish, star-gazer, painted comber, damselfish, and the flying gurnard.

The Cretaquarium and the Aquaworld Aquarium, are two of the three aquariums in the Greece. They are located in Gournes and Hersonissos respectively.

Flora
The Minoans contributed to the deforestation of Crete. Further deforestation occurred in the 1600s "so that no more local supplies of firewood were available".

Common wildflowers include: camomile, daisy, gladiolus, hyacinth, iris, poppy, cyclamen and tulip, among others. There are more than 200 different species of wild orchid on the island and this includes 14 varieties of Ophrys cretica. Crete has a rich variety of indigenous herbs including common sage, rosemary, thyme, and oregano. Rare herbs include the endemic Cretan dittany. and ironwort, Sideritis syriaca, known as Malotira (Μαλοτήρα). Varieties of cactus include the edible prickly pear. Common trees on the island include the chestnut, cypress, oak, olive tree, pine, plane, and tamarisk. Trees tend to be taller to the west of the island where water is more abundant.

Environmentally protected areas
Environmentally protected areas include the island of Elafonisi on the coast of southwestern Crete, the palm forest of Vai in eastern Crete and the Dionysades (both in the municipality of Sitia, Lasithi). Vai has a palm beach and is the largest natural palm forest in Europe. Samaria Gorge is a World Biosphere Reserve and Richtis Gorge is protected for its landscape diversity.

Mythology

Crete has a strong association with ancient Greek gods but is also connected with the Minoan civilization.

According to Greek mythology, the Diktaean Cave at Mount Dikti was the birthplace of the god Zeus. The Paximadia islands were the birthplace of the goddess Artemis and the god Apollo. Their mother, the goddess Leto, was worshipped at Phaistos. The goddess Athena bathed in Lake Voulismeni. Zeus launched a lightning bolt at a giant lizard that was threatening Crete. The lizard immediately turned to stone and became the lizard-shaped island of Dia, which can be seen from Knossos. The islets of Lefkai were the result of a musical contest between the Sirens and the Muses. The Muses were so anguished to have lost that they plucked the feathers from the wings of their rivals; the Sirens turned white and fell into the sea at Aptera ("featherless"), where they formed the islands in the bay that were called Lefkai (the islands of Souda and Leon). Heracles, in one of his labors, took the Cretan bull to the Peloponnese. Europa and Zeus made love at Gortys and conceived the kings of Crete: Rhadamanthys, Sarpedon, and Minos.

The labyrinth of the Palace of Knossos was the setting for the myth of Theseus and the Minotaur in which the Minotaur was slain by Theseus. Icarus and Daedalus were captives of King Minos and crafted wings to escape. After his death, King Minos became a judge of the dead in Hades, while Rhadamanthys became the ruler of the Elysian fields.

Culture

Crete has its own distinctive Mantinades poetry. The island is known for its Mantinades-based music (typically performed with the Cretan lyra and the laouto) and has many indigenous dances, the most noted of which is the Pentozali. Since the 1980s and certainly in the 1990s onwards there has been a proliferation of Cultural Associations that teach dancing (in Western Crete where many focus on rizitiko singing). These Associations often perform in official events but also become stages for people to meet and engage in traditionalist practices. The topic of tradition and the role of Cultural Associations in reviving it is often debated throughout Crete.

Cretan authors have made important contributions to Greek literature throughout the modern period; major names include Vikentios Kornaros, creator of the 17th-century epic romance Erotokritos (Greek Ερωτόκριτος), and, in the 20th century, Nikos Kazantzakis. In the Renaissance, Crete was the home of the Cretan School of icon painting, which influenced El Greco and through him subsequent European painting.

Cretans are proud of their island and customs, and men often don elements of traditional dress in everyday life: knee-high black riding boots (stivania), vráka breeches tucked into the boots at the knee, black shirt and black headdress consisting of a fishnet-weave kerchief worn wrapped around the head or draped on the shoulders (sariki). Men often grow large mustaches as a mark of masculinity.

Cretan society is known in Greece and internationally for family and clan vendettas which persist on the island to date. Cretans also have a tradition of keeping firearms at home, stemming from the era of resistance against the Ottoman Empire. Nearly every rural household on Crete has at least one unregistered gun. Guns are subject to strict regulation from the Greek government, and in recent years an effort to control firearms in Crete has been undertaken by the Greek police, but with limited success.

Sports
Crete has many football clubs playing in the local leagues. During the 2011–12 season, OFI Crete, which plays at Theodoros Vardinogiannis Stadium (Iraklion), and Ergotelis F.C., which plays at the Pankritio Stadium (Iraklion) were both members of the Greek Superleague. During the 2012–13 season, OFI Crete, which plays at Theodoros Vardinogiannis Stadium (Iraklion), and Platanias F.C., which plays at the Perivolia Municipal Stadium, near Chania, are both members of the Greek Superleague.

Notable people

Notable people from Crete include:

Nikos Kazantzakis, author, born in Heraklion, 7 times suggested for the Nobel Prize
Odysseas Elytis, poet, awarded the Nobel Prize in Literature in 1979, born in Heraklion
Georgios Chortatzis, Renaissance author
Vitsentzos Kornaros, Renaissance author from Sitia, who lived in Heraklion (then Candia)
Domenikos Theotokopoulos (El Greco), Renaissance artist, born in Heraklion
Nikos Xilouris, famous composer and singer.
Psarantonis, Cretan folk singer and Cretan lyra player and brother of Nikos Xilouris.
Nana Mouskouri, singer, born in Chania
Eleftherios Venizelos, former Greek Prime Minister, born in Chania Prefecture
Konstantinos Mitsotakis, nephew of Eleftherios Venizelos and Prime Minister of Greece.
Daskalogiannis, leader of the Orlov Revolt in Crete in 1770
Michalis Kourmoulis, leader of the Greek War of Independence from Messara.
Eleni Daniilidou, tennis player, born in Chania
Louis Tikas, Greek-American labor union leader
Tess Fragoulis, Greek-Canadian writer, born in Heraklion
Nick Dandolos, a.k.a. Nick the Greek, professional gambler and high roller
Joseph Sifakis, a computer scientist, laureate of the 2007 Turing Award, born in Heraklion in 1946
Constantinos Daskalakis, Associate Professor at MIT's Electrical Engineering and Computer Science department
George Karniadakis, Professor of Applied Mathematics at Brown University; and Research Scientist at MIT
John Aniston (Giannis Anastasakis), Greek-American actor, father of Jennifer Aniston
George Psychoundakis, a shepherd, a war hero and an author
 Ahmed Resmî Efendi, 18th-century Ottoman statesman, diplomat and author (notably of two sefâretnâme). Turkey's first-ever ambassador in Berlin (during the reign of Frederick the Great). He was born into a Muslim family of Greek descent in the Cretan town of Rethymno in 1700.
 Giritli Ali Aziz Efendi, Turkey's third ambassador in Berlin and arguably the first Turkish author to have written in novelistic form
 Al-Husayn I ibn Ali at-Turki, founder of the Husainid Dynasty, which ruled Tunisia until 1957
 Salacıoğlu (1750 Hanya – 1825 Kandiye), one of the most important 18th-century poets of Turkish folk literature
 Giritli Sırrı Pasha, Ottoman administrator, Leyla Saz's husband and a notable man of letters in his own right
 Vedat Tek, Representative figure of the First National Architecture Movement in Turkish architecture, son of Leyla Saz and Giritli Sırrı Pasha
 Paul Mulla (alias Mollazade Mehmed Ali), born Muslim, converted to Christianity and became a Roman Catholic monsignor and author
 Rahmizâde Bahaeddin Bediz, The first Turkish photographer by profession. The thousands of photographs he took, based as of 1895 successively in Crete, İzmir, Istanbul and Ankara (as Head of the Photography Department of Turkish Historical Society), have immense historical value.
 Salih Zeki, Turkish photographer in Chania
 Ali Nayip Zade, Associate of Eleftherios Venizelos, Prefect of Drama and Kavala, Adrianople, and Lasithi
 Ismail Fazil Pasha (1856–1921), descended from the rooted Cebecioğlu family of Söke who had settled in Crete. He was the first Minister of Public Works in the government of Grand National Assembly in 1920. He was the father of Ali Fuad and Mehmed Ali.
 Mehmet Atıf Ateşdağlı (1876–1947), Turkish officer
 Mustafa Ertuğrul Aker (1892–1961), Turkish officer who sank HMS Ben-my-Chree
 Cevat Şakir Kabaağaçlı, alias Halikarnas Balıkçısı (The Fisherman of Halicarnassus), writer, although born in Crete and has often let himself be cited as Cretan, descends from a family of Ottoman aristocracy with roots in Afyonkarahisar. *Likewise, as stated above, Mustafa Naili Pasha was Albanian/Egyptian.
 Bülent Arınç (born 25 May 1948), has been a Deputy Prime Minister of Turkey since 2009. He is of Cretan Muslim heritage with his ancestors arriving to Turkey as Cretan refugees during the population exchange between Greece and Turkey at the time of Sultan Abdul Hamid II and is fluent in Cretan Greek. Arınç is a proponent of wanting to reconvert the Hagia Sophia into a mosque, which has caused diplomatic protestations from Greece.
 Yoseph Shlomo Delmedigo, renaissance rabbi, mathematician, astronomer and philosopher
 Zach Galifianakis paternal grandparents, Mike Galifianakis and Sophia Kastrinakis, were from Crete
 Vicky Psarakis, vocalist for Canadian metal band The Agonist, is from Crete
 Georgos Kalaitzakis, Greek professional basketball player for the Milwaukee Bucks of the National Basketball Association is from Heraklion, Crete

See also 
 Cretan Greek
 Cretan lyra
 Cretan Turks
 Cretan wine
 List of novels set in Crete
 List of rulers of Crete
 Mantinades

Citations

General and citied sources 
 
 Francis, Jane and Anna Kouremenos (eds.) 2016. Roman Crete: New Perspectives. Oxford: Oxbow.

External links 

  
 Natural History Museum of Crete at the University of Crete.
 Cretaquarium Thalassocosmos in Heraklion.
 Aquaworld Aquarium in Hersonissos.
 Ancient Crete  at Oxford Bibliographies Online: Classics.
 Official Greek National Tourism Organisation website
 Interactive Virtual Tour of Crete

 
Aegean islands
Crete and Cyrenaica
Islands of Greece
Mediterranean islands
Minoan geography
Territories of the Republic of Venice